The Roman Catholic Diocese of Famagusta (Latin: Dioecesis Famagustanus) was a Latin rite diocese with see in the city of Famagusta, on the island of Cyprus during the crusader rule, and is now a Latin Catholic titular see.

History 
 After to the seventh century conquest of Cyprus by the Islamic Arabs, the Greek Metropolitan Archdiocese of Salamina-Costanza transferred its see to Famagosta, until the Catholic crusaders conquered Cyprus in 1191, and relegated the Greek Metropolitanate to a marginal part, confining it to Carpasia.
Nel 1291 il vescovo ed il capitolo di Tortosa, in Siria, città conquistata dagli Arabi, si rifugiarono a Famagosta; con una bolla di papa Bonifacio VIII del 1295, la diocesi latina di Tortosa fu unita a quella di Famagosta.
 The Latin rite see was erected in 1196 with Pope Celestinus III's consent as Diocese of Famagosta (Curiate Italian) / Famagosta antea Arsinoë in ins. Cypri (Latin) . as a suffragan of the Latin Catholic Archdiocese of Nicosia
 It was suppressed in 1571 after the Ottoman conquest of Cyprus in 1570, its Cypriot territory being reassigned to Titular Patriarchal See of Jerusalem, but immediately transformed as Titular See of Famagosta (Italiano) / Famagosta antea Arsinoë in ins. Cypri (latine)). Its former cathedral, dedicated to Saint Nicholas, was transformed into the Lala Mustafa Pasha Mosque
 In 1933 it was renamed as Titular Episcopal See of Famagusta (Latin = Curiate Italian) / Famagustan(us) (Latin adjective)

Residential Ordinaries
 Caesarius of Alagno (before 1211 – 25 September 1225), transferred to the archdiocese of Salerno
 A. (mentioned 1231)
 George (mid-13th century)
 Velasco, Order of Friars Minor (O.F.M.) (25 August 1265 – 17 September 1267), transferred to the diocese of Guarda
 Bertrand (1 September 1268 – ????)
 John (???? –  1278), elect, never consecrated
 Paganus (6 April 1278 – ????)
 William
 Matthew (before 1286 – ????), died in office
 Bernard, O.S.B. (5 September 1291 – ????), apostolic administrator
 Mancellus, O.P. (mentioned 1295)
 Guy (22 June 1298 – ???? )
 Baldwin (???? –  1328), died in office
 Mark, O.P. (14 October 1328 – 1346), died in office
 Itier of Nabinaux = Iterio di Nabinal, Order of Friars Minor (O.F.M.) (26 June 1346 – ?death? ??); previously Bishop of Limassol (1344.11.03 – 1346.06.26)
 Leodegar (Léger) of Nabinaux  (14 August 1348 – ????), died in office
 Arnaud (17 December 1365 – 13 July 1379), transferred to the diocese of Lombez
 Francesco Rafardi, O.F.M. (13 July 1379 – 28 May 1380), elect, never consecrated, transferred to the diocese of Segorbe
 James (28 May 1380 – ????), elect, died before consecrated
 Goffredo (30 July 1384 – ????)
 Rainaldo 
 Bertrando d'Alagno (12 October 1390 – 4 January 1391), transferred to the diocese of Gubbio
 Raffaele (12 October 1390 – ????)
 (un?)canonical Pietro Marinaco, O.F.M., previously Anti-bishop of Diocese of Sospel (27 August 1392 - 4 September 1409), obedient to the schismatic Papacy of Avignon
 Luchino (2 October 1395 – ????), died in office
 Luciano Lercaro (3 August 1403 – 26 September 1407), died in office
 Pietro, O.F.M. (4 September 1409 – ????), died in office
 Giovanni di Montenegro, O.F.M. (26 May 1412 – ????), anti-bishop, died in office
 Gioachino Torselli, Servite Order (O.S.M.) (14 May 1414 – ????), died in office
 Nicola di Tenda, Dominican Order (O.P.) (20 December 1417 – ????), died in office
 Giacomo Guastandenghi, O.P. (23 January 1441 – ????), died in office
 Giovanni, O.S.B. (23 May 1442 – ????), died in office
 Agostino, O.Cist. (11 May 1450 – ????), died in office
 Domenico Michiel, O.P. (23 July 1455 – ????), died in office
 Pietro, O.Carm. (11 May 1472 – ????), died in office
 Francesco de Pernisiis de Saona, O.F.M. (31 March 1473 – ????), died in office
 Pietro Milite (2 June 1477 – ????)
 Francesco Marcelli (14 June 1481 – 22 October 1488), transferred to the diocese of Traù
 Alvise Cippico (22 Oct 1488 – 11 Dec 1503), next Archbishop of Zadar)
 Marco Cornaro (11 Dec 1503 – resigned 1 July 1504), also Apostolic Administrator of Diocese of Verona (Italy) (1503.11.29 – 1524.07.24); previously created Cardinal-Deacon of S. Maria in Portico (1500.10.05 – 1513.03.19); later Latin Patriarch of Constantinople (1506.07 – 1507.10.30), transferred Cardinal-Deacon of S. Maria in Via Lata (1513.03.19 – 1523.12.14), Bishop of Padova (Italy) (1517.03.09 – 1524.07.24), Apostolic Administrator of Diocese of Nardò (Italy) (1519.01.24 – 1521.02.20), Archpriest of Papal Basilica of St. Peter in Rome (1520.09 – 1524.07.24), Protodeacon of Sacred College of Cardinals (1520.12.20 – 1523.12.14), Latin Patriarch of Constantinople (1521 – death 1524.07.24), promoted Cardinal-Priest of San Marco (1523.12.14 – 1524.05.20), promoted Cardinal-Bishop of Suburbicarian Diocese of Albano (1524.05.20 – 1524.06.15), transferred Cardinal-Bishop of Palestrina (1524.06.15 – 1524.07.24)
 Mattia Ugoni (1 Jul 1504 – resigned 1529)
 Gianfrancesco Ugoni (10 Jan 1530 – 1543 Died)
 Filippo Bona (29 Oct 1543 – 1552 Died)
 Vittore de Franceschi (12 Feb 1552 – )
 ?Coadjutor Bishop Gerolamo Ragazzoni (15 Jan 1561 – see suppressed 1571 - transferred 10 Dec 1572), no titular see; next transferred, due to the Ottoman conquest in 1571, Apostolic Administrator of Diocese of Kisamos (Crete, insular Greece) (1572.12.10 – 1576.09.19), Bishop of Novara (Italy) (1576.09.19 – 1577.07.19), Bishop of Bergamo (Italy) (1577.07.19 – death 1592.03.17), also papal diplomat : Apostolic Nuncio (ambassador) to France (1583 – resigned? 1586).

Titular see 
It is vacant since decades, having had the following incumbents, of the fitting Episcopal (lowest) rank with a few archiepiscopal exceptions:
 Titular Archbishop: Giuseppe Schiavini (1963.06.28 – 1974.04.01)
 Domenico Bernareggi (1945.06.16 – 1962.10.22)
 Ettore Castelli (1943.05.08 – 1945.05.03)
 Paolo Castiglioni (1937.01.12 – 1943.03.19)
 Giovanni Mauri (1904.11.14 – 1936.11.13)
 Federico Domenico Sala (1903.01.23 – 1903.12.05)
 Angelo Maria Meraviglia Mantegazza (1897.04.24 – 1902.09.26)
 Biagio Pisani (later Archbishop) (1895.11.29 – 1897.04.23)
 Carlo Caccia Dominioni (1857.08.03 – 1866.10.06)
 Federico Manfredini (1842.01.24 – 1857.03.19)
 Guilelmus Zerbi (1825.06.27 – 1841.08.18)
 Giovanni Martino Bernardoni Baccolo (1795.06.01 – 1823.10.12)
 Giovanni Battista Santonini (1785.06.27 – 1795.01.12)
 Franciscus Condulmer (1770.05.28 – 1785)
 Alessandro Pappafava (1761.04.06 – 1770.02.18)
 Alvise Maria Gabrieli (1758.10.02 – 1761.04.07)
 Giovanni Francesco Mora, Oratorians (C.O.) (1748.02.19 – 1758.10.02)
 Sergio Pola (1706.07.19 – 1748.02.08)
 Bishop-elect Vincenzo Bonifacio (1674.02.19 – ?)
 Giacomo Vianoli (1656.06.26 – 1673.12.18)
 Titular Archbishop: Hieronymus Gradenigo (later Patriarch) (1654.07.06 – 1656.02.22)
 Vittore Capello (1633.06.20 – ?)
 Germanico Mantica (1620.08.17 – 1633.02.21)
 Pietro Valier (later Cardinal) (1611.05.18 – 1620.05.18)
 Alberto Valier (1591.02.13 – 1606)

See also 
 List of Catholic dioceses in Cyprus

References

Sources and external links 
 GCatholic - former & titular bishopric
  L'évêché de Famagouste, in Annuaire Pontifical Catholique 1913, pp. 454–463
 Catholic-Hierarchy.org -Diocese of Famagusta". David M. Cheney (self-published)
 Bibliography
 Pius Bonifacius Gams, Series episcoporum Ecclesiae Catholicae, Leipzig 1931, p. 439
 Konrad Eubel, Hierarchia Catholica Medii Aevi, vol. 1, pp. 244–245; vol. 2, p. 152; vol. 3, p. 194; vol. 4, p. 184; vol. 5, p. 198; vol. 6, pp. 212–213
 L'évêché de Famagouste, in Annuaire Pontifical Catholique 1913, pp. 454–463
 John Hackett, A History of the Orthodox Church of Cyprus, Methuen & co., London 1901, pp. 577–587
 Siméon Vailhé, v. Famagusta, Catholic Encyclopedia, vol. V, New York 1909
 H. Rudt de Collenberg Wipertus, État et origine du haut clergé de Chypre avant le Grand Schisme d'après les Registres des Papes du XIII et du XIV siècle, in Mélanges de l'Ecole française de Rome, vol. 91, n. 1, 1979, pages 197–332 (notably pp. 202, 212-214, 223-225, 274-277, 287-288, 302-304)
 H. Rudt de Collenberg Wipertus, Le royaume et l'Église de Chypre face au Grand Schisme (1378-1417) d'après les Registres des Archives du Vatican, in Mélanges de l'Ecole française de Rome, vol. 94, n. 2, 1982, pp. 621–701 (notably pages 647-651, 654-655)

Catholic titular sees in Europe
Former Roman Catholic dioceses
Suppressed Roman Catholic dioceses
Catholic Church in Cyprus
Kingdom of Cyprus
Famagusta
16th-century disestablishments